Miss USA World 1965 was the 4th edition of the Miss USA World pageant and it was held at the Ashbury Park Convention Center in Asbury Park, New Jersey and was won by Dianna Lynn Batts of the District of Columbia. She was crowned by outgoing titleholder, Jeanne Marie Quinn of New York. Batts went on to represent the United States at the Miss World 1965 Pageant in London later that year. She finished as 1st Runner-Up at Miss World.

Results

Placements

Special awards

Delegates
The Miss USA World 1965 delegates were:

 Alabama - Judy Ann Miles
 Alaska - Carla Sullivan
 Arizona - Martha Ruth Thomas
 Arkansas - Sandy Mills
 Boston, MA - Dorothy Ann Fisher
 Bridgeport, CT Lucille Cordone
 California - Darlene Louise Ermis
 Cleveland, OH - Becky Burden
 Colorado - Pam Ransdell
 Connecticut - Betty J. Eichenser
 Delaware - Elaine Foster
 Detroit, MI - Vicki Hurley
 District of Columbia - Dianna Lynn Batts
 Florida - Mary Anna Duncan
 Georgia - Donna Jean Melton
 Illinois - Bonnie Komstock
 Indiana - Rebecca Ann Shaw
 Iowa - Michelle Callouette
 Kansas - Nancy Knox
 Kentucky - Sherry Yvonne Sellers
 Long Island, NY - Priscilla Mullin
 Maine - Virginia Thomas
 Maryland - Sharon Jane Dennis
 Massachusetts - Elaine F. Nash
 Michigan - Sharon Magnuson
 Mississippi - Mary Margaret Martin
 Missouri - Cherrie Hofman
 Montana - Patricia "Patcee" L. Bradford 
 Nevada - Linda Lauda
 New Hampshire - Olga L. Maris
 New Jersey - Camille Bonano
 New York - Dorothy Langhans
 New York City, NY - Maureen Nichols
 North Carolina - Jean Parson Pender
 Ohio - Jeanne Marie Bromley
 Pennsylvania - Caren Singer
 Philadelphia, PA - Cynthia L. Copley
 Rhode Island - Donna L. Moretti
 South Carolina - Victoria "Vicky" Elizabeth Johnson
 Tennessee - Bettye Jean Dillon
 Texas - Nancy Brooks
 Utah - Jan Sadler
 Vermont - Lea Laura Carlson
 Virginia - Cathy Jean Cornell
 Wisconsin - Bozena Wilk

Notes

Did not Compete

Crossovers
Contestants who competed in other beauty pageants:

Miss USA
1964: : Dorothy Langhans (Top 15)
1965: : Carla Sullivan (Best State Costume)
1965: : Dianna Lynn Batts (4th Runner-Up)
1965: : Patricia "Patcee" L. Bradford
1965: : Janice Sadler (Top 15)

References

External links
Miss World Official Website
Miss World America Official Website

World America
1965
1965 in New Jersey